The 1999–2000 Eliteserien season was the 61st season of ice hockey in Norway. Nine teams participated in the league, and Storhamar Ishockey won the championship.

Regular season

Playoffs

External links
Season on hockeyarchives.info

GET-ligaen seasons
Norway
GET